Viscountess Rothermere may refer to:

Patricia Harmsworth, Viscountess Rothermere (née Matthews; 1929–1992) (1st wife of the 3rd Viscount)
Maiko Jeong Shun Lee, Viscountess Rothermere  (b. 1949) (2nd wife of the 3rd Viscount)